CARE 30 is a refrigerant consisting of a blend of isobutane (R-600a) and propane (R-290) developed to replace dichlorodifluoromethane (R-12) and 1,1,1,2-tetrafluoroethane (R-134a). It is primarily for use in small commercial refrigeration and air-conditioning systems that have traditionally used R-12.

Compatibility

It operates at similar pressures and possesses similar volumetric refrigerating effect to R-12 and R-134a.  It can be used in a R12 or R134A compressor or a specific CARE 30 compressor.  It can be used with R-12 or R-134a heat exchangers and expansion devices.  It is compatible with most common refrigeration materials and lubricants.

Comparison
Comparison with R-12 and R-134a

References

Refrigerants